Andrea Eder-Gitschthaler is an Austrian politician.  She is a member of the Federal Council of Austria and has served as President of the Federal Council since 2020.  She was the vice president of that house from January to June 2020.  Previously, she served as a member of the National Council from 2006 to 2008.  She is a member of the Austrian People's Party.  In 2019, she became the first woman to chair the parliamentary group of the People's Party.

Biography
Eder-Gitschthaler was born in the town of Vöcklabruck in 1961. She attended local schools and graduated from the law faculty of the University of Salzburg in 1984.  After her legal training, she worked for the Asset Management Association, followed by an advertising agency. In 1991, she became the head of marketing for the Salzburg office of Uniqa Insurance Group. She became active in politics as a member of the municipal council of Wals-Siezenheim in 1999 and served on that body until 2014.  In 2006, she was elected to the National Council, the lower house of the Parliament of Austria. In 2008, the Austrian People's Party suffered one of its worst results ever in the election and she was denied re-election to the National Council.

In 2017, she was elected to the Federal Council by the Landtag of Salzburg.  The People's Party named her as its parliamentary group leader in 2019, making her the first woman to hold the post. On 19 December 2019, she was elected as the Second Vice President of the Federal Council, placing her next in line to assume the rotating council presidency. On 1 July 2020, Eder-Gitschthaler took over as President of the Federal Council.

References

External links
Official Page at Parliament of Austria

1961 births
Living people
Austrian People's Party politicians
Members of the National Council (Austria)
Presidents of the Austrian Federal Council
Members of the Federal Council (Austria)
People from Vöcklabruck
21st-century Austrian women politicians
21st-century Austrian politicians
University of Salzburg alumni